Wanib Sign Language is a reported sign language, possibly a village sign language, in a Heyo-speaking community of Papua New Guinea. It's spoken just to the west of Mehek Sign Language, but the two languages reflect the very different spoken languages of their communities: Wanib SL follows the SVO word order of Heyo, whereas Mehek SL follows the SOV word order of Mehek.

References

External links
Sample of Wanib sign language

Village sign languages
Sign languages of Papua New Guinea